Mike Schrage (born April 2, 1976) is an American basketball coach, currently a Special Assistant to the Head Coach at Duke University. He was formerly the head coach for the Elon Phoenix men's basketball team. He has a wife (Amanda) and two children (Andrew and Sophie)

Coaching career
While a student at Indiana University Bloomington, Schrage was a manager and student assistant with the men's basketball team. After graduation, he was hired as the director of operations at Ole Miss, where he stayed for one season before joining the academic support staff at Duke. Schrage served in that role until 2002, when he was promoted to director of basketball operations, a role he stayed in until 2008 when he joined Johnny Dawkins' staff at Stanford as an assistant coach. He would remain with the Cardinal for eight seasons until 2016, when he accepted an assistant coaching position at Butler under Chris Holtmann. He would subsequently follow Holtmann to Ohio State as an assistant coach.

On April 5, 2019, Schrage was named the 18th head coach in Elon basketball history, replacing Matt Matheny. In his debut season, Elon finished 13-21 overall.

On April 5, 2022, Schrage resigned as Elon’s head coach after three seasons in which he compiled a 33-52 record. He was hired as a special assistant to Jon Scheyer, head coach at Duke University.

Head coaching record

References

1976 births
Living people
American men's basketball coaches
Basketball coaches from Georgia (U.S. state)
College men's basketball head coaches in the United States
Butler Bulldogs men's basketball coaches
Duke Blue Devils men's basketball coaches
Elon Phoenix men's basketball coaches
Indiana University Bloomington alumni
Ohio State Buckeyes men's basketball coaches
Ole Miss Rebels men's basketball coaches
Sportspeople from Atlanta
Stanford Cardinal men's basketball coaches